Exactor may refer to:

 Someone who practices extortion
 Tax collector
 Exactor (betting) - a type of bet in parimutuel horse betting
 British Royal Artillery designation for the Spike NLOS guided missile

See also
Exact (disambiguation)